Abbé Martin usually refers to Paulin Martin, a biblical scholar specializing in Semitic languages (full name Abbé Paulin Martin).

Abbé Martin, Abbot Martin or Abbess Martin, may also refer to:

Abbé Martin, secondary co-author (or author quoted extensively by Abbé Raynal) of the Histoire des deux Indes
Abbé Martin (early 19th century), priest in charge of the Parish Church of St. Aphrodise in Béziers, southern France (see Seafield_Convent_Grammar_School#Revolutionary origins)

See also
Abby Martin (disambiguation)
Abbey of Saint Martin (disambiguation)
Abbess Martin (1604–1672), Abbess of the Poor Clares of Galway
Abbot Martin (527–601), Abbot and founder of Vertou Abbey